Khavatkoppa is a village in Belagavi district in Karnataka, India.

It is located on the Krishna river bank. There are three main Temples one is the old Hanuman temple the Kalmeshwar temple and Venkateshwar temple, which was started by priest Shrinivas acharya Nadpurohit and Kulkarni family.

References

Villages in Belagavi district